Alamjeet Kaur Chauhan is an Indian lawyer and former model. She was crowned Femina Miss India in 1978.

Early life and career
She was born in Punjab in the year 1955. In 1978, she entered the Femina Miss India contest and won the title. She was also declared the winner of Miss Beautiful smile sub-award at the pageant. She represented India in the Miss Universe 1978 pageant where she won the Best National Costume Award.
After completing her one-year tenure with Femina Miss India she returned to pursue her career as a lawyer.

References

1955 births
Living people
Femina Miss India winners
Indian beauty pageant winners
Miss Universe 1978 contestants
Female models from Punjab, India
20th-century Indian lawyers
20th-century Indian women lawyers
21st-century Indian lawyers
21st-century Indian women lawyers